Ice castle may refer to:

 Ice palace, a building made of blocks of ice
 Frost flowers, the natural phenomenon
Ice Castles, a 1978 American romantic drama film
Ice Castles (2010 film), a 2010 remake of the 1978 film
"Ice Castles", song by Ween from their 2000 album White Pepper
Ice Castles, album by Larry Heard

See also
Ice Palace (disambiguation)